Roland Asch (born 12 October 1950 in Altingen, West Germany) is a race car driver from Ammerbuch, near Stuttgart. Asch was a distinctive figure on the German motor racing scene in the 1990s.

Racing career

Asch's career started in 1973 with slalom before moving to hillclimbing to become German Champion in 1981. After racing on circuits in the lower Trophy division of the Deutsche Rennsport Meisterschaft, he made his Deutsche Tourenwagen Meisterschaft (DTM) début at age 34 in 1985. From 1985 to 1994 Asch drove for Mercedes in DTM, moving to the German Supertouring Championship (STW) in 1995 for four years when the DTM faltered.

Apart from touring car racing, Asch was also busy in Porsche series. He won the German Porsche 944 Turbo Cup twice, in 1988 and 1989, before winning the German Porsche Carrera Cup in 1991.

In his 50s, Asch returned to the German Porsche Carrera Cup, where he raced until 2003, bar a one-off race during the 2004 season. In 2004 he also drove races in the European Touring Car Championship for RS-Line Ford, the brand he runs a dealership for at Ammerbuch.

From 1999 until 2005 Asch raced the 24 Hours Nürburgring, aboard the Nissan Skyline GT-R entry of Japanese team Falken every year as their lead driver. He last appeared on the race in 2010, in a project made by German magazine Sport auto (Germany) and Porsche test driver Walter Röhrl, who did not take part due to health reasons.

Currently, he is supporting his son Sebastian Asch, who is racing in the SEAT León Cup.

Incidents 
In 1994, Asch was involved in a controversial incident in DTM at the Alemannenring. Alessandro Nannini, racing for rivals Alfa Romeo, was running directly ahead of an already lapped Asch. While closing on a car in front, Nannini momentarily locked his rear wheels on the entry to the hairpin. He then regained control and took the racing line into the corner. Asch intentionally plowed into the side of Nannini, spinning him and damaging his car. As a result of this, Asch's Mercedes teammate Klaus Ludwig won the championship. After entering the pits, Nannini rejoined behind Asch and intentionally rammed him off the track in revenge at the same hairpin.

At the end of the 1999 and final STW season at the Nürburgring, Asch was again accused by some of hitting an opponent intentionally to support his Opel teammate Uwe Alzen. Asch was called into the pits for a jump start penalty, but later stated that his radio had failed. On the last lap, he was driving behind championship contenders and race leaders Alzen and Christian Abt, who were about to lap Abt's teammate Kris Nissen. With the championship already going Abt's way as per the running order, Nissen tangled with Alzen on the second-to-last corner, causing heavy damage to Alzen's car. Asch then hit the Audi of Abt in the last corner, handing the cup to Alzen, who came home second with his damaged car. While this incident was initially considered a race accident, Asch was punished for ignoring the penalty. Alzen celebrated immediately after the race, but the championship was given to Abt in November after Asch's move on him in the last corner was considered deliberate action by a DMSB court of appeal, based on video evidence.

Racing record

Complete Deutsche Tourenwagen Meisterschaft results
(key) (Races in bold indicate pole position) (Races in italics indicate fastest lap)

Complete Super Tourenwagen Cup results
(key) (Races in bold indicate pole position) (Races in italics indicate fastest lap)

References

External links 
Homepage of a fan
 

1950 births
Living people
German racing drivers
Deutsche Tourenwagen Masters drivers
Racing drivers from Baden-Württemberg
Porsche Supercup drivers
ADAC GT Masters drivers
European Touring Car Championship drivers
24H Series drivers
Auto racing controversies
Mercedes-AMG Motorsport drivers
Abt Sportsline drivers
Team Rosberg drivers
Walter Lechner Racing drivers
Morand Racing drivers
Nürburgring 24 Hours drivers
Porsche Carrera Cup Germany drivers